Glen Horton (born 12 April 1983) is  a New Zealand rugby union player (fullback), formerly playing for the Super Rugby team Highlanders. Horton made his Super 14 debut in 2004, only 21 years old.

References
 Highlanders player profiles
Southland Stags Profile

1983 births
Living people
Otago rugby union players
Southland rugby union players
Highlanders (rugby union) players
New Zealand rugby union players
New Zealand expatriate rugby union players
Expatriate rugby union players in Russia
Māori All Blacks players
Rugby union fullbacks
People from Taihape
Rugby union players from Manawatū-Whanganui